Moghamarat ayn × 2 (Arabic: مغامرات ع × ٢ or English: "Adventures ×2") is a series of mystery stories by detective author Nabil Farouk which combines the elements of mystery, excitement, and movement; and takes us to a new world full of heroes who fight against crime and pursue justice. The series revolves around two twins--Emad and Ala--who are both intelligent children and have a distinct ability to observe the finer things in life. They can connect the small details to each other, which is what makes them able to help their father--Charity--who works in one of the Egyptian security firms which works in resolving some of the issues that the nation faces.

Books in the series

External links
Official website
Google Translate of the official website

References

Egyptian novels
Arabic-language novels